Krisher is a surname, an Americanized form of Krischer. Notable people with the surname include: 

Bernard Krisher (1931–2019), American journalist
Bill Krisher (born 1935), American football player

See also
Oliver Krischer (born 1969), German politician

References

Americanized surnames